William John Horschel (born December 7, 1986) is an American professional golfer who currently plays on the PGA Tour.

Early years and amateur career
Horschel was born and raised in Grant, Florida. He attended Bayside High School in neighboring Palm Bay.
 
Horschel accepted an athletic scholarship to attend the University of Florida, Gainesville, where he played for coach Buddy Alexander's Florida Gators men's golf team in National Collegiate Athletic Association (NCAA) competition from 2006 to 2009. He was a four-time All-American, including three first-team honors, and the Southeastern Conference (SEC) player of the year in 2007 and 2009. He was a 2008 PING southeast all-region selection. He graduated from the University of Florida with a bachelor's degree in sport management in 2009. He represented the United States at the Palmer Cup on two occasions in 2007 and 2008 gaining 4.5 points. He posted a 3–1 record for the victorious 2007 Walker Cup team.

Horschel won the individual medalist honors at the 2006 U.S. Amateur, shooting a two-day score of 138 (60-78, −5) at Hazeltine National Golf Club in Chaska, Minnesota. His opening round of 60 was an 18–hole tournament and USGA record. He failed to make it past the third round of match play. He also played in the 2006 U.S. Open, but he missed the cut.

Professional career
Horschel turned professional in 2009. In December 2009, he successfully gained a 2010 PGA Tour card through qualifying school. A wrist injury limited Horschel to four PGA Tour events that year, and he did not make the cut in any of them.

In December 2010, he regained his Tour card through qualifying school to back up his medical extension should he fail to earn enough to secure his Tour Card. In February 2011, he made the cut at the Mayakoba Golf Classic, his first in eleven PGA Tour starts, finishing T13. Horschel finished the season 140th on the money list, granting him conditional status for 2012.

Horschel finished third at the 2012 True South Classic, but only finished 147th on the 2012 money list. Horschel's best finish on the Web.com Tour is a 4th at the 2012 Stadion Classic at UGA.

After his third successful attempt in four trips to Q School, he earned his PGA Tour Card for 2013. He began his season making the cut in every tournament he entered. He had three consecutive top-10 finishes before his breakthrough win at the 2013 Zurich Classic of New Orleans in his 61st PGA Tour start. Horschel made six consecutive birdies in the fourth round and won by one stroke over D. A. Points. The win moved Horschel to third in the FedEx Cup standings, third on the PGA Tour money list, and 49th in the Official World Golf Ranking. It earned him entry to the 2013 PGA Championship, the 2013 WGC-Bridgestone Invitational, The Players Championship, and the 2014 Masters Tournament. His world ranking also earned him entry into the U.S. Open. By the end of April 2013, Horschel led the PGA Tour in consecutive cuts made with twenty-three, dating from the FedEx St. Jude Classic in June 2012. That streak ended when he missed the cut at The Players Championship, the tournament he played in after his win.

In the 2013 U.S. Open, Horschel held the joint lead with Phil Mickelson, at the halfway stage of the tournament. Playing in his first major as a professional, he was one of only two players under par after the second round, hitting all 18 of Merion's greens in regulation. He shot rounds of 72–74 over the weekend to finish at five-over-par for the tournament and four strokes behind eventual winner Justin Rose. Horschel finished T4 in his first major as a professional and moved up to 34th in the world rankings and 4th in the FedEx Cup standings.

Horschel earned his second win at the 2014 BMW Championship and moved to 23rd in the world rankings. The next week, he won The Tour Championship at East Lake Golf Club and with it the FedEx Cup. The win also moved Horschel to 14th in the OWGR.

Two days after winning the Tour Championship and FedEx Cup, Horschel became a father for the first time.

In May 2017, Horschel won the AT&T Byron Nelson in a playoff over Jason Day.

In April 2018, Horschel won the Zurich Classic of New Orleans with partner Scott Piercy.

In March 2021, Horschel won the WGC-Dell Technologies Match Play defeating Scottie Scheffler 2 & 1 in the final. This was his first World Golf Championship victory. In September later that year, he won the BMW PGA Championship by shooting a final-round 65. It was his second European Tour victory.

In June 2022, Horschel won Memorial Tournament at Muirfield Village in Dublin, Ohio, his seventh PGA Tour title.

In September 2022, Horschel was selected for the U.S. team in the 2022 Presidents Cup; he won one and lost two of the three matches he played.

Personal life
Horschel met Brittany Nelson when both were golfers at the University of Florida. They were married in 2010 and have three children. Horschel is also a supporter of West Ham United F.C.

Professional wins (8)

PGA Tour wins (7)

PGA Tour playoff record (1–1)

European Tour wins (2)

 The BMW PGA Championship is also a Rolex Series tournament.

Results in major championships
Results not in chronological order in 2020.

CUT = missed the half-way cut
"T" indicates a tie for a place
NT = No tournament due to COVID-19 pandemic

Summary

Most consecutive cuts made – 5 (twice)
Longest streak of top-10s – 1

Results in The Players Championship

CUT = missed the halfway cut
"T" indicates a tie for a place
WD = withdrew
C = Canceled after the first round due to the COVID-19 pandemic

World Golf Championships

Wins (1)

Results timeline
Results not in chronological order before 2015.
 
1Cancelled due to COVID-19 pandemic

QF, R16, R32, R64 = Round in which player lost in match play
NT = No tournament
"T" = Tied
Note that the Championship and Invitational were discontinued from 2022.

U.S. national team appearances
Amateur
Palmer Cup: 2007 (winners), 2008
Walker Cup: 2007 (winners)
Eisenhower Trophy: 2008
Professional
Wendy's 3-Tour Challenge (representing PGA Tour): 2013
Presidents Cup: 2022 (winners)

See also

2009 PGA Tour Qualifying School graduates
2010 PGA Tour Qualifying School graduates
2012 PGA Tour Qualifying School graduates
List of Florida Gators men's golfers on the PGA Tour
List of University of Florida alumni

References

External links

Horschel's Twitter page

American male golfers
Florida Gators men's golfers
PGA Tour golfers
Golfers from Florida
People from Grant, Florida
People from Jacksonville Beach, Florida
1986 births
Living people